Salamandra longirostris, the Penibetic salamander or long-snouted salamander, is a species of urodelan amphibian of the family Salamandridae. It is endemic to the Penibetic mountain range in Andalusia, Spain. It was originally described as a subspecies of Salamandra salamandra, the fire salamander, but was raised to full species rank in 2009.

It is a large salamander, very similar to the fire salamander, with which it does not share a distribution area. The body is black with quadrangular yellow spots and some very characteristic spots on the head. The snout is pointed and the belly greyish, without spots.

The spots mark where poison is secreted through the skin.

It lives in humid areas, with watercourses nearby, where it reproduces.

References 

longirostris
Endemic amphibians of the Iberian Peninsula
Endemic fauna of Spain
Amphibians described in 1994
Taxa named by Ulrich Joger